Bbs Paranoicos is a Chilean punk rock band formed in 1991. They are one of the most popular punk bands in Chile.

Bands like Lagwagon, Rise Against, Alkaline Trio, No Use For A Name, Descendents, All and Bad Religion have been cited as influences by the band. The band is a staple in important punk rock concerts and festivals in the country and has opened for popular international acts such as  Misfits, Circle Jerks, Dead Kennedys, No Use For A Name, Millencolin, Siniestro Total, Lagwagon, MXPX, No Fun at All, Pennywise, Green Day and Negu Gorriak, among others. BBs Paranoicos has toured extensively in Chile throughout the band's existence and has also played in Argentina, Peru, Brazil, Uruguay and Spain, with significant stakes such as "Cumbre del Rock 2009" and "Lollapalooza Chile 2012", Cosquiìn Rock and Mexico`s Domination Fest 2019.

Members 
 Current members
Omar Acosta – lead vocals, guitars (since 1996)
Carlos Kretchmer – vocals, bass (since 1991)
Pedro López – guitars, backing vocals (since 1991)
Juan Herrera – drums (1991–2005, since 2009)

 Former members
Alex Patiño – lead vocals (1991–1999)
Cedric – guitars (1994–1999)
Boyle – drums (1991)
Daniel Tobar – drums (2005–2009)
Memo – drums (2003–2005)

Discography 
Studio albums
Incierto Final (1993, Sello Alerce)
Fábricas Mágicas... Lápidas Tétricas (1995, Toxic)
Hardcore Para Señoritas (1997, Ta Ke Sale!/Deifer)
Collage (1999, Ta Ke Sale!/Alerce/Alerta)
Algo no Anda (2000, Ta Ke Sale!/Discos Suicidas)
Capital (2003, Alerce)
Antídoto (2008, M&M)
Cruces (2014, Bolchevique, Inhumano)
Delusional (2018, Pulpa Discos, Inhumano)

 Slipts
BBS Paranoicos / E.M.S. (2001)
BBS Paranoicos / Desperate Cry (2010)
BBS Paranoicos / White Flag (2012)

 Live albums
La Victoria Del Perdedor (2008)

 Compilation albums
Escasos Exitos. The history of BBS Paranoicos (Paranoia Recordings, 2001)
Cambia El Tiempo (Antología 1993 - 2003) (Alerce, 2003)

 Demos
Dulces Bebés Paranoicos (1991)

 EPs
El Ensayo (2000, Ta0KeSale!)
Uno (2005)
Dos (2005)

Chilean punk rock groups
Musical groups established in 1991
1991 establishments in Chile